Nikola Mileusnic (born 17 July 1993) is an Australian football player who plays attacking midfielder for A-League Men club Brisbane Roar. He previously played for Danish Superliga club Randers and A-League Men club Adelaide United. He is one of the fastest players in the world, having exceeded 36km/h in games.

Career

Adelaide United
Mileusnic made his professional football debut for A-League side Adelaide United in a 1-1 draw against the Brisbane Roar on 11 November 2016, coming off the bench in the 65th minute. He scored in the 2017 FFA Cup Final against Sydney FC, in which the Reds lost 2–1 in extra time. He played in Adelaide's FFA Cup final wins in 2018 and 2019, scoring in the 2019 final.

Randers FC
On 5 October 2020, Mileusnic joined Danish Superliga club Randers on a deal for the 2020–21 season and became a regular starter in both the League and Cup. He played in the 2021 Danish Cup final victory over SønderjyskE and featured throughout the campaign, including scoring in the quarter final against Vejle. Following the conclusion of the season, Randers announced they would not extend Mileusnic's contract, Mileusnic then returned to Australia.

Brisbane Roar
On 21 June 2021, it was confirmed he had signed for Brisbane Roar ahead of the 2021-22 A-League season.

Personal life
Mileusnic holds a Master's degree in Petroleum Engineering.

Honours

Club
Adelaide United
 FFA Cup: 2018, 2019

Randers
Danish Cup: 2020–21

References

External links 

Living people
1993 births
Australian soccer players
Australian expatriate soccer players
Association football midfielders
Adelaide City FC players
Adelaide United FC players
Brisbane Roar FC players
Randers FC players
National Premier Leagues players
A-League Men players
Danish Superliga players
Australian people of Serbian descent
FK Beograd (Australia) players
Australian expatriate sportspeople in Denmark
Expatriate men's footballers in Denmark